Canrenone, sold under the brand names Contaren, Luvion, Phanurane, and Spiroletan, is a steroidal antimineralocorticoid of the spirolactone group related to spironolactone which is used as a diuretic in Europe, including in Italy and Belgium. It is also an important active metabolite of spironolactone, and partially accounts for its therapeutic effects.

Medical uses
Canrenone is mainly used as a diuretic.

Canrenone has been found to be effective in the treatment of hirsutism in women.

Heart failure 
Two studies of canrenone in people with heart failure have shown a mortality benefit compared to placebo. In the evaluation which studied people with chronic heart failure (CHF), people that were treated with canrenone displayed a lower number of deaths compared to the placebo group, indicating a death and morbidity benefit of the medication. 

One study compared 166 treated with canrenone to 336 given conventional therapy lasting 10 years. Differences in systolic and diastolic blood pressure was observed between both patient groups where, patients treated with canrenone, showed a lower blood pressure compared to conventional therapy. Uric acid was lower in the group treated with canrenone; however, no differences were seen in potassium, sodium, and brain natriuretic peptide (BNP) levels. Left ventricular mass was also lower in the group treated with canrenone and a greater progression of NYHA class was observed in the control group compared to patients treated with canrenone.

Another study concluded that treatment with canrenone in patients with chronic heart failure improves diastolic function and further decreased BNP levels.

Pharmacology

Pharmacodynamics
Canrenone is reportedly more potent as an antimineralocorticoid relative to spironolactone, but is considerably less potent and effective as an antiandrogen. Similarly to spironolactone, canrenone inhibits steroidogenic enzymes such as 11β-hydroxylase, cholesterol side-chain cleavage enzyme, 17α-hydroxylase, 17,20-lyase, and 21-hydroxylase, but once again, is comparatively less potent in doing so.

Pharmacokinetics
The elimination half-life of canrenone is about 16.5 hours.

As a metabolite
Canrenone is an active metabolite of spironolactone, canrenoic acid, and potassium canrenoate, and is considered to be partially responsible for their effects. It has been found to account for approximately 10 to 25% of the potassium-sparing effect of spironolactone, whereas another metabolite, 7α-thiomethylspironolactone (7α-TMS), accounts for around 80% of the potassium-sparing effect of the drug.

History
Canrenone was described and characterized in 1959. It was introduced for medical use, in the form of potassium canrenoate (the potassium salt of canrenoic acid), by 1968.

Society and culture

Generic names

Brand names
Canrenone has been marketed under the brand names Contaren, Luvion, Phanurane, and Spiroletan, among others.

Availability
Canrenone appears to remain available only in Italy, although potassium canrenoate remains marketed in various other countries as well.

See also
 Canrenoic acid
 Potassium canrenoate

References

11β-Hydroxylase inhibitors
21-Hydroxylase inhibitors
Aldosterone synthase inhibitors
Antimineralocorticoids
Cholesterol side-chain cleavage enzyme inhibitors
CYP17A1 inhibitors
Diuretics
Human drug metabolites
Lactones
Pregnanes
Progestogens
Spiro compounds
Spirolactones
Spironolactone
Steroidal antiandrogens
World Anti-Doping Agency prohibited substances
Conjugated dienes
Enones